This is a list of bands that play electro-industrial and its subgenres: dark electro, aggrotech, and power noise.

!?
[:SITD:]
:wumpscut:

0–9
3Teeth

A
A Split Second
à;GRUMH...
Accessory
Advanced Art
Aesthetic Perfection
Agonoize
Alter Der Ruine
Amduscia
Anders Manga
Android Lust
Angelspit
Armageddon Dildos
Ashbury Heights
Asmodeus X
Assemblage 23
Aural Vampire
Ayria

B
Birmingham 6
Blue Stahli
Blutengel
Borghesia

C
C-Tec
Celldweller
Cenobita
Chemlab
Circle of Dust
Cobalt 60
Coinside
Cold Therapy
Combichrist
Concrete/Rage
Covenant
Crocodile Shop
Culture Kultür
Cyanotic
Cyberaktif
Cyborg Attack
Cygnosic
Click Click

D
Dance or Die
Das Ich
Dawn of Ashes (early)
Decoded Feedback
Detroit Diesel
Die Krupps
Die Warzau
Digital Poodle
Dive
dreDDup

E
Edge of Dawn
Eisenfunk
Esplendor Geometrico
Euphorbia
Evils Toy (before changing to T.O.Y.)

F
Feindflug
Finite Automata
Flesh Field
Forma Tadre (Navigator)
Front 242
Front Line Assembly
Funker Vogt

G
Glis
God Module
Grendel
Gridlock

H
Haujobb
Headscan
Heimataerde
HEALTH
Hocico

I
Icon of Coil
Imperative Reaction
In Strict Confidence
Informatik
Interface
iVardensphere

K
Kevorkian Death Cycle
Kidneythieves
Klinik
KMFDM

L
Leæther Strip
Lights of Euphoria
Laibach

M
Meat Beat Manifesto
Mentallo & the Fixer
Mind in a box
Mommy Hurt My Head
My Life with the Thrill Kill Kult

N
Nachtmahr
Negative Format
Neikka RPM
New Mind
Noise Unit
Noisuf-X
Non-Aggression Pact
Nitzer Ebb
Numb

O
ohGr
Oomph!
Orange Sector

P
Panic Lift
Placebo Effect
Pouppée Fabrikk
Pride and Fall
Project Pitchfork
Psy'Aviah
Psychopomps
Psyclon Nine
PTI

R
Rabia Sorda
Razed in Black
Reaper
The Retrosic
Rotersand

S
Schallfaktor
Sheep on Drugs
Skinny Puppy
Society Burning
Sonar
Spahn Ranch
Spetsnaz
Straftanz
Suicide Commando
Swamp Terrorists

T
Testube
Terrorfakt

U
Unit 187
Unter Null

V
Velvet Acid Christ
Virtual Embrace
VNV Nation
Vomito Negro

W

X

X-Fusion
X Marks the Pedwalk
Xorcist
Xotox

Y
Yeht Mae
yelworC
Young Gods

Z
Zombie Girl

References

See also
List of industrial music bands
List of industrial metal bands

Electro-Industrial Bands